Shankar Pannu (18 November 1949) is a former Member of Parliament from Ganganagar constituency. He is a member of Indian National Congress.

References

External links
Biographical Sketch Member of Parliament 12th Lok Sabha

1949 births
Living people
India MPs 1998–1999
Lok Sabha members from Rajasthan
People from Sri Ganganagar district
Indian National Congress politicians from Rajasthan